International Journal of Bifurcationand Chaos in Applied Sciences and Engineering (often abbreviated as IJBC) is a peer-reviewed scientific journal published by World Scientific. It was established in 1991 and covers chaos theory and nonlinear science in a diverse range of fields in applied science and engineering.

Abstracting and indexing 
According to the Journal Citation Reports, the journal had a impact factor of 2.836 in 2020. The journal is abstracted and indexed in:
 Science Citation Index
 Current Contents Physical, Chemical and Earth Sciences
 CompuMath Citation Index
 Science Citation Index Expanded (also known as SciSearch)
 ISI Alerting Services
 Mathematical Reviews
 INSPEC
 Zentralblatt MATH

References

External links 
 

Chaos theory
Engineering journals
World Scientific academic journals
English-language journals
Publications established in 1991
Physics journals